A Portuguese netlabel launched by Stealing Orchestra in 2001.

The original idea was to create a way to freely share EPs by the band or their side projects but soon it expanded to include items by other artists.

Discography

031 - Stealing Orchestra - Deliverance (First paid album, also released in CD)
030 - Dr. Phibes & The Ten Plagues of Egypt - Le Sacre du Printemps (Le Sacrifice)
029 - G.G. Allin's Dick - Groovy Tunes for Old Ladies
028 - G.G. Allin's Dick - Grandes Éxitos
027 - Dr. Phibes & The Ten Plagues of Egypt - Carmina Burana
026 - Luís Antero - Sinfonia Amphibia
025 - Invacuo - Mark Twain in Japan
024 - Sta. Apolónia - EP I
023 - Dr. Phibes & The Ten Plagues of Egypt - Music of the Gods - Vol. II
022 - Dr. Phibes & The Ten Plagues of Egypt - Music of the Gods - Vol. I
021 - Zoogoo - Zoogoo
020 - Duo Inmortales - Legends of Domination
019 - The Crevulators - The Crevulators
018 - Party People in a Can - Way off, where the Spirits are
017 - V/A - You Are Not Stealing Bor Land
016 - Nobody's Bizness - Ao Vivo Na Capela da Misericórdia (Sines 2005)
015 - Slipper - Attack of the Killer Lobsters
014 - The Transmitters (band) - Count Your Blessings (1987/89)
013 - Worriedaboutsatan - Worriedaboutsatan
012 - I.T.B.A. - In Rain... I Wonder
011 - Sparkles - Saleko
010 - Dr. Frankenstein - The Cursed Tapes
009 - Vincent Bergeron - L'Art du Désarroi
008 - Someone Else - You Can Name This EP
007 - The Prostitutes - Live At Porto-Rio
006 - G.G. Allin's Dick - King of the Road
005 - Sir Edmund et L'Autre - Ne peuvent être vendus séparément
004 - Children for Breakfast - Ham
003 - Stealing Orchestra - The Haunted and Almost Lost Songs 97-98
002 - Stealing Orchestra - Bu!
001 - Stealing Orchestra - É Português? Não Gosto!

External links
 You Are Not Stealing Records Website
 You Are Not Stealing Records at myspace
 You Are Not Stealing Records at Free Music Archive
 You Are Not Stealing Records at discogs

References

Netlabels
Portuguese independent record labels
Online music stores of Portugal